Shumack is a surname. Notable people with the surname include:

 Andrew Shumack, American journalist
 Jack Shumack (1904–1974), Australian rugby league footballer 
 Samuel Shumack (1850–1940), Australian pioneer and author